Dichomeris sylphe is a moth in the family Gelechiidae. It was described by Ronald W. Hodges in 1986. It is found in North America, where it has been recorded from Florida.

References

Moths described in 1986
sylphe